Coroner is a Swiss thrash metal band from Zürich. They garnered relatively little attention outside of Europe. Formed in 1983, the band broke up in 1996, but reformed 14 years later. The band has performed at multiple live venues and festivals around worldwide since 2011, and plans to release their first studio album in three decades in 2023.

Coroner's music combines elements of thrash, classical music, avant-garde music, progressive rock, jazz, and industrial metal with suitably gruff vocals. With their increasingly complex style of progressive rock-infused thrash, they have been called "the Rush of thrash metal", and along with Voivod and Watchtower, the band has been credited for helping pioneer the subgenre of "technical thrash metal" (also called "progressive thrash metal") during the mid-to-late 1980s. Coroner's sound then progressed and the production became more refined, resulting in the more progressive albums No More Color (1989), Mental Vortex (1991) and Grin (1993).

History

Career and breakup

The Swiss thrash trio Coroner were originally road crew for Celtic Frost. They eventually cut their own songs, recording their demo Death Cult in 1986 with Tom G. Warrior of Celtic Frost on vocals. Their first full-length album R.I.P., released in 1987, featured bass player Ron Broder on vocals and he assumed the role for the rest of the group's existence. The meaning of the band name Coroner is related to the crown or officer of the crown that is referenced by some of their songs.  

Coroner released four more albums within next decade: Punishment for Decadence (1988), No More Color (1989), Mental Vortex (1991) and Grin (1993), as well as the compilation album Coroner (1995), which also included some new and unreleased material; each release was acclaimed by critics and the public alike. Other than having toured relentlessly for more than half a decade (including the US three times), and all of their music videos receiving airplay on MTV's Headbangers Ball ("Masked Jackal", "Last Entertainment" and the cover version of the Beatles' "I Want You (She's So Heavy)"), Coroner never achieved much commercial success, which had contributed to the band slowly falling apart during the mid-1990s. Coroner officially disbanded after a farewell tour consequent to their self-titled album in January and February 1996.

Reunion
In March 2005, talks of a reunion were in the works, but later retracted. The main reason was that neither Marky, Ron, nor Tommy had the time it would require to do this properly, and also that none of them liked to "reheat things, except spaghetti sauce." In June 2010, however, Coroner announced that they would reunite for next year's installments of Maryland Deathfest, Hellfest Summer Open Air and Bloodstock Open Air. The band was asked if they were planning to write a new album. Guitarist Tommy Vetterli replied, "you know, making a new album is kind of difficult... (Pause) Well, you never know. Maybe after four or five shows we'll get into it and say, 'Hey! Let's do an album!' Nobody knows what's going to happen. We don't have a master plan".

In April 2011, drummer Marky Edelmann was asked why Coroner decided to reunite after their 15-year break up. He replied, "It was a total trip; it was really like a time warp. It was totally strange. Sometimes you could play the songs automatically; it was still somehow programmed. It was really funny; your arms go left and right, and you don't know why. 'Oh, wow, that's why. I have to hit this cymbal right now.' [Laughs] So that was really quite a trip. It makes me feel like being [brought] back [in time] 15 years or more. And I missed playing drums, totally. That was also something I'm very happy about now — to just play drums." Marky also stated that a new Coroner album was not in the cards, but he also stated that the band could reissue their back catalog.

In June 2011, Vetterli told RadioMetal.com that Coroner has been recording shows for a future live album and also plan to release a career spanning DVD in the future. Asked about new material, he mentioned that they might record one song or two. Tommy also stated that if Coroner makes a new album he would have to "try to convince" Marky and Ron and would not do it without them.

On 12 February 2014, drummer Marky Edelmann announced that he would be leaving Coroner at the end of the month, citing a disinterest in new material, as opposed to Broder and Vetterli. On 24 May 2014, Diego Rapacchietti was announced as the new drummer for Coroner.

Despite their earlier decision not to release new material, guitarist Tommy Vetterli stated that Coroner plans to work on a potential follow-up to Grin. In June 2015, Ron revealed in an interview (released on Italian webzine "Artists and Bands") that: "We are still individually in the process of collecting songwriting ideas. We have not started recording yet, but once we come together, it will probably proceed quickly. We are planning on hitting the studio towards the end of this year, hopefully." On 26 July 2016, it was announced that Coroner had entered the studio to begin recording their new album, which was initially set for release in 2017; however, it did not surface in 2017 and there had been no news about the album until April 2020, when Coroner announced via Twitter that they were "going to record a NEW album this year." In a May 2021 interview with Agoraphobic News, former drummer Markus "Marky" Edelmann (who has remained in contact with his former bandmates since leaving Coroner in 2014) stated that the band was planning to "finally go to the studio this fall" to work on their new album. In a May 2022 interview, Vetterli said, "We've actually started the recording, we have started recording drums, six songs are recorded and two more songs are ready, but Ron's part is missing and then we have to write another one, and then we hit the studio and record it."

November 2020 saw work begin on the official band biography. Undertaken by writer Kriscinda Lee Everitt, this book will draw on extensive internationally-sourced press from 1986 to the present and equally substantial personal interviews with Marky Edelmann, Ron Broder, and Tommy Vetterli, plus musicians, producers, promoters, managers, myriad fellow travelers, and fans. As of 2022, the book has an Instagram and Facebook presence where fans can stay updated on its progress.

Evolution and style
Musically, Coroner evolved from a speed metal band with gothic and classical overtones like Celtic Frost and Bathory into a technical metal band. Coroner's first album, R.I.P., was based on neoclassical lines and was technical and classically influenced.

The second album, Punishment for Decadence, saw a progression into a more complex sound with a unison of bass and guitar. Tempo changes interspersed mid-paced sections and the odd slow passage between the faster passages started to emerge. Lyrically, Coroner began to write about themes such as politics and personal introspection. The album contains some of their more well-known songs, including "Skeleton on Your Shoulder" which appears in the video game Brütal Legend.

No More Color was produced by Pete Hinton and the band. Coroner's music became more technical on No More Color as the guitar work was characterized by intricate modes and arpeggios, solo work that was chromatically colorful, as well as the de rigueur crunchy chords and speed runs; the drumming went beyond the 4/4 time of Coroner's two previous albums to incorporate unusual time signatures which became their trademark.  Ron Royce's bass playing is also worth a mention as having an advanced three-finger technique which enables him to double the rhythm line as well as perform more intricate riffs. Prime examples of this are the opener "Die By My Hand" with its vicious riffing and the harmonic minor inspired riff in the middle of "Mistress of Deception". The closer "Last Entertainment" is a prescient take on TV. The opening track "Die By My Hand" is a classic piece of prog come thrash metal. It is technical but also brutal. 

Mental Vortex continued the evolution over No More Color. Continuing with the previous album's technical formula, the speed metal formula was re-integrated into Coroner's sound on this album but with a tone that made it sound not at all like R.I.P. or Punishment for Decadence. There were slower songs but none of the songs on Mental Vortex stayed the same speed for very long. The songs on Mental Vortex ranged from four to eight minutes. The last track "I Want You (She's So Heavy)" is a cover of the Beatles song, and a video was shot of it. Overall, the tone was a shift from the thrash/technical of No More Color which showed them gravitating towards their opus Grin.

Grin saw a much more industrial and groovy sound and was a natural progression from Mental Vortex but was different from most of their previous material. It involved reflective guitar riffs and underlying bass line. It was a slower record and more refined in its metal sensibility. Brooding guitar over Royce's bass produced an almost hypnotic trance-like sound on some tracks. The lead guitar still shone on all tracks.

Their self-titled album, Coroner, was a compilation which contained unreleased material, a selection of hits from previous albums, and a remix of the title song from the previous album Grin.

Band members

Current
Ron Broder (as Ron Royce) – bass, lead vocals 
Tommy Vetterli (as Tommy T. Baron) – guitars, backing vocals 
Diego Rapacchietti – drums 

Live members
Daniel Strössel – keyboards, samples, backing vocals (1996; 2010–present)

Former
Pete Attinger – vocals 
Phil Puzctai – bass 
Tommy Ritter – guitars 
Oliver Amberg – guitars 
René Schmidt – guitars 
Marky Edelmann (as Marquis Marky) – drums 

As of 2014, no founding member has remained in Coroner, since founding drummer Marquis Marky abandoned the band that year after a 31-year duty.
Bassist/vocalist Ron Royce and guitarist Tommy T. Baron have been the only continual members of Coroner since 1985.
All band members and lineup are according to Encyclopedia Metallum

Timeline

Discography

Studio albums
R.I.P. (1987)
Punishment for Decadence (1988)
No More Color (1989)
Mental Vortex (1991)
Grin (1993)

Compilations
Coroner (1995)
The Unknown Unreleased Tracks 1985–95 (1996)
Includes two demos, two remixes, the soundtrack for an unreleased documentary, and a record of one of their last concerts before the reunion.

Singles
"Die By My Hand" (1989)
"Purple Haze" (1989)
"I Want You (She's So Heavy)" (1991)

Demos
Depth of Hell (1983)
Death Cult (1986)
R.I.P. demo (1987)
Punishment for Decadence (1988)

Videography
No More Color Tour '90 – Live in East Berlin (1990, VHS/LaserDisc)
"Masked Jackal" (music video)
"Last Entertainment" (music video)
"I Want You (She's So Heavy)" (music video)

References

Further reading

External links

Swiss heavy metal musical groups
Swiss thrash metal musical groups
Progressive metal musical groups
Musical groups established in 1985
Musical groups disestablished in 1996
Musical groups reestablished in 2010
Swiss musical trios
Noise Records artists
1985 establishments in Switzerland